Julian Loose (born May 17, 1985) is a German footballer who plays for SC Greven 09.

External links

Julian Loose at Kicker

1985 births
Living people
German footballers
Arminia Bielefeld players
FC Schalke 04 II players
SC Preußen Münster players
Sportfreunde Lotte players
3. Liga players
Association football midfielders